Hyalophysa clampi is a species of freshwater alveolates known as an apostome ciliate. It was found on crayfish and described by Jeremy S. Browning and Stephen C. Landers in 2012.

References 

Oligohymenophorea
Protists described in 2012